The Cohn–Sichel House is a house located in northwest Portland, Oregon listed on the National Register of Historic Places.

See also
 National Register of Historic Places listings in Northwest Portland, Oregon

References

External links
 

1907 establishments in Oregon
Bungalow architecture in Oregon
Historic district contributing properties in Oregon
Houses completed in 1907
Houses on the National Register of Historic Places in Portland, Oregon
Northwest Portland, Oregon